Radley Martinez (born March 12, 1978) is retired American mixed martial artist. He was signed with Bellator Fighting Championships, where he competed in their featherweight division.

Amateur Wrestling Career

Martinez was a standout wrestler in college, competing for Clarion University. While at Clarion, Martinez qualified for the NCAA championships on three occasions. As a sophomore in 2001 with a fourth-place finish at the EWL(Eastern Wrestling League) championships, in 2002 with a second-place finish at the EWL championships and in 2003 with a third-place finish at the EWL championships. In 2003, as a senior he entered the NCAA tournament unseeded but made All American honors when he captured a fifth-place finish. In the fifth place bout he defeated #2 seed Cliff Moore of Iowa by decision 4–0. Martinez ended his career with a 98–27 record.

Mixed martial arts career

Early career
Martinez made his professional MMA debut in January 2008 and has made a name for himself fighting mainly in the West Coast region. Before signing with Bellator, he amassed an impressive record of 9 wins and 2 losses.

Bellator Fighting Championships
Martinez made his Bellator debut at Bellator 50 in September 2011, where he defeated Brian van Hoven by decision. He returned to the promotion at Bellator 62 on the preliminary card against Doug Frey and won via first-round TKO.

In the fall of 2012, Martinez entered as a participant in the Bellator Featherweight Tournament.  He faced Nazareno Malegarie in the opening round at Bellator 76.  He won the fight via unanimous decision.

Martinez eventually faced Shahbulat Shamhalaev in the finals of the Season Seven Featherweight Tournament on February 21, 2013 at Bellator 90. Despite winning the first round, Martinez lost the fight via knock out in the second round.

Martinez had his retirement fight at Bellator 114 on March 28 where he defeated Edson Berto by unanimous decision.

Personal life
Martinez was also featured on ESPN's Outside the Lines in June 2011. The story covered how Martinez took care of his paraplegic father while trying to maintain a career in mixed martial arts.
Martinez is a good friend and was a college wrestling teammate of former UFC Lightweight Champion Frankie Edgar.

Championships and accomplishments
Bellator Fighting Championships
Bellator Season 7 Featherweight Tournament Runner-Up

Mixed martial arts record

|-
| Win
| align=center| 15–3
| Edson Berto
| Decision (unanimous)
| Bellator 114
| 
| align=center| 3
| align=center| 5:00
| West Valley City, Utah, United States
| 
|-
| Loss
| align=center| 14–3
| Shahbulat Shamhalaev
| KO (punch)
| Bellator 90
| 
| align=center| 2
| align=center| 2:12
| West Valley City, Utah, United States
| Bellator Season 7 Featherweight Tournament Final
|-
| Win
| align=center| 14–2 
| Wagnney Fabiano
| Decision (unanimous)
| Bellator 80
| 
| align=center| 3
| align=center| 5:00
| Hollywood, Florida, United States
| Bellator Season 7 Featherweight Tournament Semifinal
|-
| Win
| align=center| 13–2 
| Nazareno Malegarie
| Decision (unanimous)
| Bellator 76
| 
| align=center| 3
| align=center| 5:00
| Windsor, Ontario, Canada
| Bellator Season 7 Featherweight Tournament Quarterfinal
|-
| Win
| align=center| 12–2
| Doug Frey
| TKO (punches)
| Bellator 62
| 
| align=center| 1
| align=center| 4:08
| Laredo, Texas, United States
| 
|-
| Win
| align=center| 11–2
| Greg McFarland
| TKO (punches)
| Fight Kings – Phenoms
| 
| align=center| 1
| align=center| 2:02
| Hollywood, Florida, United States
| 
|-
| Win
| align=center| 10–2
| Brian van Hoven
| Decision (unanimous)
| Bellator 50
| 
| align=center| 3
| align=center| 5:00
| Hollywood, Florida, United States
| 
|-
| Loss
| align=center| 9–2
| Brian Cobb
| Submission (rear-naked choke)
| FFW 3: Back in Bakersfield
| 
| align=center| 2
| align=center| 3:41
| Bakersfield, California, United States
| 
|-
| Win
| align=center| 9–1
| Mike Christensen
| Decision (unanimous) 
| Showdown Fights: New Blood
| 
| align=center| 3
| align=center| 5:00
| Orem, Utah, United States
| 
|-
| Win
| align=center| 8–1
| Joe Brammer
| TKO (doctor stoppage) 
| ZarMMA: Fight Night
| 
| align=center| 3
| align=center| 3:27
| Layton, Utah, United States
| 
|-
| Win
| align=center| 7–1
| Jacob Clark
| Decision (unanimous) 
| KOTC: Underground 57
| 
| align=center| 3
| align=center| 5:00
| Cortez, Colorado, United States
| 
|-
| Win
| align=center| 6–1
| Steve Sharp
| Decision (unanimous) 
| Throwdown Showdown 5: Homecoming
| 
| align=center| 5
| align=center| 5:00
| Orem, Utah, United States
| 
|-
| Win
| align=center| 5–1
| Stryder Davis
| Decision (unanimous)
| Throwdown Showdown 4: Cuatro
| 
| align=center| 5
| align=center| 5:00
| West Valley City, Utah, United States
| 
|-
| Win
| align=center| 4–1
| David Allred
| TKO (punches)
| Jeremy Horn's Elite Fight Night 6
| 
| align=center| 1
| align=center| 2:13
| Layton, Utah, United States
| 
|-
| Win
| align=center| 3–1
| Steve Sharp
| Decision (unanimous)
| Throwdown Showdown 2: The Return
| 
| align=center| 5
| align=center| 5:00
| Orem, Utah, United States
| 
|-
| Win
| align=center| 2–1
| Eddie Pelczynski
| TKO (punches)
| Jeremy Horn's Elite Fight Night 3
| 
| align=center| 1
| align=center| 1:25
| Salt Lake City, Utah, United States
| 
|-
| Loss
| align=center| 1–1
| Travis Marx
| Decision (unanimous)
| Throwdown Showdown 1: Showdown
| 
| align=center| 3
| align=center| 5:00
| Orem, Utah, United States
| 
|-
| Win
| align=center| 1–0
| Dan Berry
| TKO (punches) 
| UCE: Round 30 – Episode 4
| 
| align=center| 1
| align=center| 2:31
| Salt Lake City, Utah, United States
|

External links

References

American male mixed martial artists
Light heavyweight mixed martial artists
Mixed martial artists utilizing collegiate wrestling
Mixed martial artists from Utah
American male sport wrestlers
1978 births
Living people